The February 2010 Khyber mosque bombing occurred at a mosque in Dars village in Tirah Valley of Khyber Agency in Pakistan on February 18, 2010. At least 30 people died and more than 70 were injured.

Attack
The blast occurred at a mosque which was used by members of banned militant group Lashkar-e-Islam. The bombing appeared to target a leader of the pro Taliban group and happened next to a market selling Hashish.

Aftermath
The blast was condemned by Pakistan's Prime Minister Yousaf Raza Gilani. The bombing was thought to be result of a feud between rival militant groups.

See also
List of terrorist incidents, 2010
List of terrorist incidents in Pakistan since 2001

References

2010 murders in Pakistan
21st-century mass murder in Pakistan
Mass murder in 2010
Mosque bombings by Islamists
Massacres in religious buildings and structures
Suicide bombings in Khyber Pakhtunkhwa
Terrorist incidents in Pakistan in 2010
Improvised explosive device bombings in Khyber Pakhtunkhwa
February 2010 events in Pakistan
Mosque bombings in Pakistan
February 2010 crimes